Walter Perry (1921–2003) was a Scottish academic and vice chancellor of the Open University.

Walter Perry may also refer to:

 Walter Copland Perry (1814–1911), British author and barrister-at-law
 Walter Perry (footballer) (1868–1928), English footballer
 Walter Perry (baseball) (1915–1980), American Negro league catcher

See also
 Walter and Perry, characters from the television series Home Movies
 Walter Perrie (born 1949), Scottish poet
 Walter Berry (disambiguation)